Act Like Nothing's Wrong is the seventh solo studio album by the American singer-songwriter Al Kooper, recorded and released in 1976.

Background
After the release of his sixth studio album Naked Songs in 1973, Kooper took time off from solo recording to concentrate on his new discovery, Lynyrd Skynyrd. After producing and playing on their first three albums, he resumed his solo recording career in 1976. The resulting album, Act Like Nothing's Wrong was recorded mostly in Southeastern US studios with a wide array of musicians. The album opens with his own funky version of "This Diamond Ring", a song that he co-wrote for Gary Lewis and the Playboys in 1964. The album continues in the “soul-funk” vein with a mix of covers and original compositions. This was Kooper's first and only album for United Artists. It was six years before he recorded his next album, Championship Wrestling. The front cover shows Al Kooper's head superimposed on the body of the dancer and model Linda Hoxit (his girlfriend at the time), while on the back cover is Linda Hoxit's head on Kooper's body.

Track listing
All tracks composed by Al Kooper; except where indicated
 "Is We on the Downbeat" – 0:36
 "This Diamond Ring" (Kooper, Bob Brass, Irwin Levine) – 4:13
 "She Don't Ever Lose Her Groove" (Willie Hale) – 3:47
 "I Forgot to Be Your Lover" (Booker T. Jones, William Bell) – 2:58
 "Missing You" – 3:58
 "Out of Left Field" (Dan Penn, Spooner Oldham) – 5:10
 "(Please Not) One More Time" – 3:33
 "In My Own Sweet Way" – 2:42
 "Turn My Head Towards Home" (Kooper, John Simon) – 4:35
 "A Visit to the Rainbow Bar and Grill" – 0:40
 "Hollywood Vampire" – 6:03

Personnel

 Steve Alaimo – engineer
 Ron Bogdon – bass
 J. R. Cobb – bass
 Gary Coleman – percussion, bongos, conga
 Bob Edwards – engineer
 Gene Eichelberger – engineer
 Robert Ferguson – drums, vocals
 Dominic Frontiere – horn arrangements
 Steve Gibson – guitar, rhythm guitar
 Hilda Harris – backing vocals
 John Henning – engineer
 Bruce Hensal – engineer
 Ron Hicklin Singers – backing vocals
 Linda Hoxit – engineer
 Denis King – engineer
 Al Kooper – guitar, arranger, electric guitar, keyboards, vocals, clavinet, producer, engineer, horn arrangements
 Kelly Kotera – engineer
 Bobby Langford – engineer
 Mike Leech – bass
 Willie "Little Beaver" Hale – guitar
 Larrie Londin – drums
 Harry Lookofsky – violin
 George "Chocolate" Perry – bass
 Alan Robinson – liner notes
 Tim Sadler – engineer
 Rick Sanchez – engineer
 John Simon – arranger, producer
 Rick Smith – engineer
 Steve Smith – engineer
 Marvin Stamm – trumpet, soloist
 Tower of Power – horns
 Wendy Waldman – backing vocals
 Joe Walsh – slide guitar
 Bobby Wood – organ, piano, electric piano
 Reggie Young – guitar, vocals
 Tubby Zeigler – drums

References

1976 albums
Al Kooper albums
United Artists Records albums
Albums produced by Al Kooper
Albums produced by John Simon (record producer)